This list is of the Cultural Properties of Japan designated in the category of  for the Prefecture of Fukushima.

National Cultural Properties
As of 1 July 2020, five Important Cultural Properties have been designated, being of national significance.

Prefectural Cultural Properties
As of 18 February 2020, twenty-seven properties have been designated at a prefectural level.

See also
 Cultural Properties of Japan
 List of National Treasures of Japan (paintings)
 Japanese painting
 List of Historic Sites of Japan (Fukushima)
 List of Places of Scenic Beauty of Japan (Fukushima)

References

External links
  Cultural Properties in Fukushima Prefecture

Cultural Properties,Fukushima
Cultural Properties,Paintings
Paintings,Fukushima
Lists of paintings